Aston Rowant National Nature Reserve is located on the north-west escarpment of the Chiltern Hills, in the Chilterns Area of Outstanding Natural Beauty. It is listed as a Grade 1 site in A Nature Conservation Review. The reserve is in several sections, mostly in the parish of Lewknor in Oxfordshire, with smaller sections in the parish of Stokenchurch in Buckinghamshire.

The reserve is home to plants and butterflies of chalk grassland. The flowers include at least seven species of orchid and the Chiltern gentian; the butterflies include the silver-spotted skipper and the Adonis blue.

As well as chalk grassland, the reserve contains woodland with beech, yew, and juniper. Overhead, reintroduced red kites are resident.

Habitats 

The Aston Rowant reserve is managed by Natural England assisted by the Oxford Conservation Volunteers. It offers a nationally important habitat of chalk grassland and juniper scrub with significant areas of hanging beechwood at Aston Rowant Wood.

Flowers 

Aston Rowant is especially noted in spring and summer for the wildflowers and orchids associated with close-cropped chalk grassland, managed by careful grazing regimes. Orchid species recorded include common spotted orchid, fragrant orchid, pyramidal orchid, bee orchid, frog orchid, early purple orchid and greater butterfly orchid. Other flowers include eyebright, scabious, marjoram, Chiltern gentian, and yellow-wort.

Butterflies 

The chalk grassland habitat is particularly attractive to many species of butterflies such as the Adonis blue, the chalkhill blue, marbled white, silver-spotted skipper, the dark green fritillary, and the silver-washed fritillary. Over 30 species of butterflies have been recorded on the reserve.

Mammals 

Muntjac and roe deer are found on the reserve, as are the brown hare. Aston Rowant is an important conservation site for the endangered hazel dormouse.

Reintroductions 

In 1989, the Aston Rowant NNR became one of the initial four sites selected by the RSPB and Natural England for the reintroduction to England of the red kite, which had become extinct in England and Scotland due to persecution since the early 1900s, and reduced to a residual population of a few dozen pairs in central Wales.
Initially birds were brought in from Spain but the reintroduction programme based in the Chilterns was so successful that the local population has now self-generated to a level of approximately 200 pairs and chicks are now taken from the Chilterns population for reintroduction projects elsewhere in the UK.

In the summer of 2004, seeds of the interrupted brome grass, which had become extinct in the wild, were dispersed at the Aston Rowant NNR. The plants successfully germinated, fruited and persisted. This marked the first extinct plant to be re-introduced into the wild in British history.

M40 controversy 

The M40 motorway passes through the reserve, where the Aston Rowant Cutting creates an important geological exposure of the Coniacian chalk strata, and drops the motorway down onto the Oxfordshire plain between Junction 5 Stokenchurch and junction 6 Watlington.
This section of the "Midlands Link" motorway opened in 1974 after a Public Enquiry. The event helped to motivate conservation groups to oppose infrastructure projects that would damage protected natural habitats, such as the M3 cutting through Twyford Down near Winchester, which could have been protected by tunnelling.

References 

National nature reserves in England
Nature reserves in Oxfordshire
Nature reserves in Buckinghamshire
Chiltern Hills
Sites of Special Scientific Interest in Buckinghamshire
Sites of Special Scientific Interest in Oxfordshire
Nature Conservation Review sites